Tasmanoonops is a genus of Australian araneomorph spiders in the family Orsolobidae, and was first described by V. V. Hickman in 1930.

Species
 it contains thirty species, found in New South Wales, Queensland, Victoria, Western Australia, and Tasmania:
Tasmanoonops alipes Hickman, 1930 (type) – Australia (Tasmania)
Tasmanoonops australis Forster & Platnick, 1985 – Australia (Western Australia)
Tasmanoonops buang Forster & Platnick, 1985 – Australia (Victoria)
Tasmanoonops buffalo Forster & Platnick, 1985 – Australia (Victoria)
Tasmanoonops complexus Forster & Platnick, 1985 – Australia (Queensland)
Tasmanoonops daviesae Forster & Platnick, 1985 – Australia (Queensland)
Tasmanoonops dorrigo Forster & Platnick, 1985 – Australia (New South Wales)
Tasmanoonops drimus Forster & Platnick, 1985 – Australia (Victoria)
Tasmanoonops elongatus Forster & Platnick, 1985 – Australia (New South Wales)
Tasmanoonops fulvus Hickman, 1979 – Australia (Tasmania)
Tasmanoonops grayi Forster & Platnick, 1985 – Australia (New South Wales)
Tasmanoonops hickmani Forster & Platnick, 1985 – Australia (Queensland)
Tasmanoonops hunti Forster & Platnick, 1985 – Australia (New South Wales)
Tasmanoonops inornatus Hickman, 1979 – Australia (Tasmania)
Tasmanoonops insulanus Forster & Platnick, 1985 – Australia (Tasmania)
Tasmanoonops magnus Hickman, 1979 – Australia (Tasmania)
Tasmanoonops mainae Forster & Platnick, 1985 – Australia (Western Australia)
Tasmanoonops minutus Forster & Platnick, 1985 – Australia (Victoria)
Tasmanoonops mysticus Forster & Platnick, 1985 – Australia (New South Wales)
Tasmanoonops oranus Forster & Platnick, 1985 – Australia (Victoria)
Tasmanoonops otimus Forster & Platnick, 1985 – Australia (New South Wales)
Tasmanoonops pallidus Forster & Platnick, 1985 – Australia (New South Wales)
Tasmanoonops parinus Forster & Platnick, 1985 – Australia (New South Wales)
Tasmanoonops parvus Forster & Platnick, 1985 – Australia (Queensland)
Tasmanoonops pinus Forster & Platnick, 1985 – Australia (New South Wales)
Tasmanoonops ripus Forster & Platnick, 1985 – Australia (New South Wales)
Tasmanoonops rogerkitchingi Baehr, Raven & Hebron, 2011 – Australia (Queensland)
Tasmanoonops septentrionalis Forster & Platnick, 1985 – Australia (Queensland)
Tasmanoonops trispinus Forster & Platnick, 1985 – Australia (Tasmania)
Tasmanoonops unicus Forster & Platnick, 1985 – Australia (Queensland)

See also
 List of Orsolobidae species

References

Araneomorphae genera
Orsolobidae
Spiders of Australia